Horaglanis alikunhii is a species of airbreathing catfish endemic to India. It was described by Subhash Babu Kallikadavil and Nayar in 2004.

References

Horaglanis
Catfish of Asia
Cave fish
Freshwater fish of India
Fish described in 2004